Chuvash National Radio is a Chuvash-language radio station based in Cheboksary, broadcasting in many Chuvash Republic cities, and via the internet.

Its director and chief editor is Oleg Prokopiev.

History
Chuvash National Radio began a test announcement on April 25, 2009. For participants of the celebratory meeting devoted to Day of the Chuvash language which is annually in April, 25th in Cheboksary in I. Ya. Yakovlev's square before National library, direct inclusion of radio station has been organized.

The formation of Chuvash National Radio occurred in three stages. The first stage was from April to May, 2009, featuring news and musical programs, as well as programs for children. The second stage began on September 1, 2009 with news and programs for children and youth and literary drama programs. Since January 1, 2010, the radio station airs full-time programming.

The Ministry of Culture of the Chuvash Republic stated that the goal of creating a Chuvash radio station from the ground up is the development of a system of information support for the population, upholding constitutional law regarding the reception of socially significant information, and the ability to notify residents in case of emergency situations.

Programming

Programming
60% of programming is in the Chuvash language, 35% in Russian and 5% in other languages spoken in the Chuvash Republic. 30% of programs are informational, 30% educational and 20% drama and musical. Informational programs leave five hours per day.

Radio frequencies
On the basis of the transferring equipment of branch FGUP «Radio television transmitting center» two frequencies are assigned to Chuvash National Radio: VHF 71.41 MHz (the transmitter is located in Ibresi) and FM 105.0 MHz (the transmitter is located in Tsivilsk). By means of these transmitters 80% of the territory of the Chuvash Republic, except for Cheboksary and Novocheboksarsk, are covered. According to federal law, on-air broadcasting in cities with a population of over 100,000 is authorized only on the basis of a license. It, in turn, is given out after federal competition is carried out. Therefore, as of 2009 in Cheboksary and Novocheboksarsk it is only possible to listen to Chuvash National Radio broadcasts on the "third button" wire announcement.

Online broadcast
The radio's programming is broadcast online using Microsoft Media Server.

Programs
There are a number of program topics and formats. Topics include event announcements, memorial calendars, incidents, sports news, interviews, and commentary.

Musical programs are aired no less than three hours per day: a "musical mix" (live concerts), youth musical hour and musical blocks per program for children and youth, in blocks of social programs. Popular music of various genres – in Chuvash and Russian as well as foreign music – is offered to listeners.

Special place is given to programs on public health services, social policy, and education issues. Educational programs are divided by age: for young children, school-aged children and youth.

Literary-drama programs are aired on the days off. In these blocks news, the literary-drama, musical, children's and youth programs, the special program «Year of the farmer», the total information-analytical program, programs of a social orientation and the special project «the House and an economy» also are assumed.

Chuvash National Radio also features radio performances from the Chuvash State Academic Drama Theater and the Chuvash State Youth Theater.

Each region and city in the Chuvash Republic have the certain day of an announcement. Daily "inclusions" from rural area and a city of Chuvashiya are on air planned. In an air special cycles and headings about life of the Chuvash diaspora in the Russian regions and abroad also are presented.

Chuvash programs
  – 'New book', editor: Olga Barinova
 
  – 'Family', editor: Roza Dementsova
  – 'Early morning', editor: Lira Leont'eva
  – 'Fantastic country', editor: Oxana Alexandrova
  – 'Grandmother's trunk', editor: Oxana Alexandrova
  – editor: Roza Dementsova
  – 'Morning concert'
  – 'Colloquial lesson', editor: Olga Barinova
  – 'Night mix', editor: Oxana Alexandrova
  – 'Gift', editor: Roza Dementsova
  – 'Literary world', editors: Leonid Antonov, Marina Vyazanova
  – 'Moomok's tales', editor: Valery Iovlev
  – 'Gratitude', editor: Arseny Tarasov
  – 'Our guests', editor: Roza Dementsova
  – 'Radio library'
  – 'Voice of the Republic'
  – 'Homeland's history', editor: Olga Barinova
  – 'Television', editor; Roza Dementsova
  – 'News'
  – 'Chuvash people's tradition', editor: Olga Barinova
  – 'Heart's light', editor: Roza Dementsova
  – 'Cordial words', editor: Alena Terent'eva
  – 'Inheritor', editor: Roza Dementsova
  – 'From village to village', editor: Vladimir Egorov
  – 'Rural business'

Russian programs
  – editor: Julia Stepanova
  – editor: Marina Tolstova
  – editor: Voldemar Egorov
  – editor: Marina Tolstova
  – editor: Jory Fedorov
  – editor: Jory Fedorov
  – editor: Marina Tolstova
  – editor: Marina Tolstova
  – editor: Julia Stepanova
  – editor: Alexander Shuldeshov
  – 'Our owners', editor: Julia Stepanova
  – 'Non-format', editor: Jory Fedorov
 
  – 'News'
  – editor: Jory Fedorov
 
  – editor: Julia Stepanova
  – 'Radio mix'
  – editor: Julia Stepanova
  – editor: Julia Stepanova
  – editor: Jory Fedorov
 
  – editor: Jory Fedorov
  – editor: Alexander Shuldeshov
  – editor: Alexander Valeev

See also 
 Chuvash National Movement
 Chuvash National Broadcasting Company
 Radio of Chuvashia
 ChuvashTet
 Chuvash Wikipedia
 List of Chuvashes
 Chuvash National Museum
 Society for the study of the native land
 Chuvash National Congress

References

External links
 Official site.
 Archives of the Chuvash national radio.
 Information about Chuvash national radio in the site of the Culture Dept., Chuvash Republic
 on-line_translation

Radio stations in Russia
Cheboksary
Chuvash-language radio stations